Thomas Watson-Wentworth, 1st Marquess of Rockingham, KB, PC (I) (13 November 1693 – 14 December 1750) of Wentworth Woodhouse, Yorkshire was a British Whig politician who sat in the House of Commons from 1715 until 1728 when he was raised to the Peerage as Baron Malton.

Early life

Watson-Wentworth was born at Tidmington, Worcestershire the only son and heir of Thomas Watson (later Watson-Wentworth, the third son of Edward Watson, 2nd Baron Rockingham) and his wife, Alice Proby, a daughter of Sir Thomas Proby, 1st Baronet. He was admitted at St John's College, Cambridge on 15 May 1707 and was awarded MA in 1708. In 1708, he bought Hallfield House, near Sheffield. On 22 September 1716, he married Lady Mary Finch, a daughter of Daniel Finch, 2nd Earl of Nottingham, and his second wife, Ann Hatton. He succeeded his father to Wentworth Woodhouse in 1723, remodelling the house to its present form.

Career
At the 1715 general election, Watson-Wentworth was elected in a contest as Member of Parliament for the family borough of Malton. He was returned again unopposed at the 1722 general election. On the death of his father in 1723 he set himself up as leader of the Whigs in Yorkshire. In 1725, he was appointed a Knight of the Bath. At the 1727 general election he was returned unopposed as MP for Yorkshire instead. In 1728, he was created Baron Malton and vacated his seat in the House of Commons.

At this time, now Lord Malton, he deliberately burned most of the manuscripts left by the 17th-century antiquary Richard Gascoigne; this act has been attributed to legal advice from his attorney. He was admitted to the Privy Council of Ireland in 1733 and was Lord Lieutenant of the West Riding of Yorkshire from 1733 to 1750. In 1734, he was created Earl of Malton, and in 1746, Marquess of Rockingham. He had inherited the Barony of Rockingham and Rockingham Castle from his cousin, Thomas Watson, 3rd Earl of Rockingham, earlier in 1746.

Family
Lord Rockingham died on 14 December 1750, according to Walpole 'drowned in claret', and was buried in York Minster. He and his wife Mary had five children:

William, styled Viscount Higham (1728–1739).
Charles, 2nd Marquess of Rockingham (1730–1782), Prime Minister of Great Britain.
Lady Anne (d. 1769), married William Fitzwilliam, 3rd Earl Fitzwilliam.
Lady Mary, married John Milbanke.
Lady Henrietta Alicia, married William Sturgeon.

References

|-

|-

|-

1693 births
1750 deaths
Alumni of St John's College, Cambridge
Knights Companion of the Order of the Bath
Lord-Lieutenants of the West Riding of Yorkshire
Members of the Privy Council of Ireland
Members of the Parliament of Great Britain for English constituencies
British MPs 1715–1722
British MPs 1722–1727
British MPs 1727–1734
Whig (British political party) MPs
Marquesses of Rockingham
Peers of Great Britain created by George II
Parents of prime ministers of the United Kingdom